Randolph "Randy" Young (June 12, 1898 – October 26, 1975) was an American football end who played for one season for the Decatur Staleys of the American Professional Football Association. He played college football at Millikin University.

External links
Ranny Young Bio (Staley Museum)

References

1898 births
1975 deaths
Millikin Big Blue football players
Decatur Staleys players
Players of American football from Kansas
Sportspeople from Salina, Kansas